The 37th Los Angeles Film Critics Association Awards, given by the Los Angeles Film Critics Association (LAFCA), honored the best in film for 2011.

Winners

Best Picture:
The Descendants
Runner-up: The Tree of Life
Best Director:
Terrence Malick – The Tree of Life
Runner-up: Martin Scorsese – Hugo
Best Actor:
Michael Fassbender – A Dangerous Method, Jane Eyre, Shame, and X-Men: First Class
Runner-up: Michael Shannon – Take Shelter
Best Actress:
Yoon Jeong-hee – Poetry (Shi)
Runner-up: Kirsten Dunst – Melancholia
Best Supporting Actor:
Christopher Plummer – Beginners
Runner-up: Patton Oswalt – Young Adult
Best Supporting Actress:
Jessica Chastain – Coriolanus, The Debt, The Help, Take Shelter, Texas Killing Fields, and The Tree of Life
Runner-up: Janet McTeer – Albert Nobbs
Best Screenplay:
Asghar Farhadi – A Separation (Jodaeiye Nader az Simin)
Runner-up: Nat Faxon, Jim Rash, and Alexander Payne – The Descendants
Best Cinematography:
Emmanuel Lubezki – The Tree of Life
Runner-up: Cao Yu – City of Life and Death (Nanjing! Nanjing!)
Best Production Design:
Dante Ferretti – Hugo
Runner-up: Maria Djurkovic – Tinker Tailor Soldier Spy
Best Music Score:
The Chemical Brothers – Hanna
Runner-up: Cliff Martinez – Drive
Best Foreign Language Film:
City of Life and Death (Nanjing! Nanjing!) • China
Runner-up: A Separation (Jodaeiye Nader az Simin) • Iran
Best Documentary/Non-Fiction Film:
Cave of Forgotten Dreams
Runner-up: The Arbor
Best Animation:
Rango
Runner-up: The Adventures of Tintin
New Generation Award:
Antonio Campos, Sean Durkin, Josh Mond, and Elizabeth Olsen – Martha Marcy May Marlene
Career Achievement Award:
Doris Day
The Douglas Edwards Experimental/Independent Film/Video Award:
Bill Morrison – Spark of Being

References

External links
 37th Annual Los Angeles Film Critics Association Awards

2011
Los Angeles Film Critics Association Awards
Los Angeles Film Critics Association Awards
Los Angeles Film Critics Association Awards
Los Angeles Film Critics Association Awards